Daniel Acácio (born 27 December 1977 in Botucatu) is a Brazilian professional mixed martial artist, also current Superior Challenge Welterweight Champion and 100% Fight Middleweight Champion. He is most notable for his fights in PRIDE Fighting Championships and has previously fought for M-1 Global, Shooto, Pancrase, Impact FC, Jungle Fight, Fight Festival and Konfrontacja Sztuk Walki.

Championships and accomplishments

Mixed martial arts 
100% Fight
100% Fight Middleweight Championship (One time, current)
Fury FC
Fury FC Middleweight Grand Prix Finalist (2007)
Konfrontacja Sztuk Walki
Fight of the Night (One time) vs. Aslambek Saidov 
Superior Challenge
Superior Challenge Welterweight Championship (One time)

Mixed martial arts record

|- 
|Loss
|align=center|31-19
|Nico Musoke
|Decision (unanimous)
|Superior Challenge 18
|
|align=center|3
|align=center|5:00
|Stockholm, Sweden
|
|-
| Win
| align=center| 31-18
| Jivko Stoimenov 
| KO (punch)
| Porto Fight Club 3
| 
| align=center| 1
| align=center| 1:35
| Braga, Portugal
|
|-
| Loss
| align=center| 30–18
| Renato Gomes
| Decision (unanimous)
| Aspera FC 12
| 
| align=center| 3
| align=center| 5:00
| Sao Jose, Santa Catarina, Brazil
|
|-
| Loss
| align=center| 30–17
| Rafal Moks
| Submission (guillotine choke)
| KSW 28
| 
| align=center| 1
| align=center| 4:42
| Szczecin, Poland
| 
|-
| Loss
| align=center| 30–16
| Sergio Souza
| KO (punch)
| THF: The Hill Fighters 2
| 
| align=center| 2
| align=center| 0:21
| Gramado, Brazil
| 
|-
| Loss
| align=center| 30–15
| Alan Carlos
| KO (punch)
| Superior Challenge: Helsingborg
| 
| align=center| 1
| align=center| 0:36
| Helsingborg, Sweden
| 
|-
| Loss
| align=center| 30–14
| Aslambek Saidov
| Decision (unanimous)
| KSW 25
| 
| align=center| 3
| align=center| 5:00
| Wroclaw, Poland
| 
|-
| Win
| align=center| 30–13
| Silmar Nunes
| Decision (unanimous)
| Iron Fight Combat 4
| 
| align=center| 3
| align=center| 5:00
| Paraná, Brazil
| 
|-
| Win
| align=center| 29–13
| Guilherme Gomes
| Decision (unanimous)
| Shooto - Brasil 33: BOPE II
| 
| align=center| 3
| align=center| 5:00
| Rio de Janeiro, Brazil
| 
|-
| Win
| align=center| 28–13
| Patrick Vallée
| Decision (unanimous)
| 100% Fight 11: Explosion
| 
| align=center| 3
| align=center| 5:00
| Paris, France
| Wins 100% Fight Middleweight Championship
|-
| Loss
| align=center| 27–13
| Pete Spratt
| Decision (unanimous)
| Amazon Forest Combat 2
| 
| align=center| 3
| align=center| 5:00
| Manaus, Brazil
| Although Acacio was knocked out with a spinning backfist, it was after the 5 minute mark and it went to decision
|-
| Win
| align=center| 27–12
| Arimarcel Santos
| KO (punches)
| Iron Man Championship 13
| 
| align=center| 1
| align=center| 2:45
| Belém, Brazil
| 
|-
| Win
| align=center| 26–12
| Jose Gomes de Ribamar 
| TKO (punches)
| Kumite MMA Combate
| 
| align=center| 2
| align=center| 2:57
| Porto Alegre, Brazil
| 
|-
| Win
| align=center| 25–12
| Luis Melo
| KO (punches)
| Amazon Forest Combat 1
| 
| align=center| 1
| align=center| 2:50
| Manaus, Brazil
| 
|-
| Loss
| align=center| 24–12
| Hernani Perpetuo
| Decision (split)
| Clube da Luta 
| 
| align=center| 3
| align=center| 3:00
| Rio de Janeiro, Brazil
| Welterweight Grand Prix Semifinal
|-
| Win
| align=center| 24–11
| Felipe Arinelli
| KO (punches)
| Fatality Arena 3
| 
| align=center| 1
| align=center| 2:58
| Niteroi, Rio de Janeiro, Brazil
| 
|-
| Win
| align=center| 23–11
| Diego Gonzalez
| Decision (unanimous)
| Superior Challenge 7 
| 
| align=center| 3
| align=center| 5:00
| Stockholm, Sweden
| Defended Superior Challenge Welterweight Championship 
|-
| Loss
| align=center| 22–11
| Bruno Santos
| Decision (unanimous)
| WFE 8: Platinum
| 
| align=center| 5
| align=center| 5:00
| Brazil
| 
|-
| Win
| align=center| 22–10
| David Bielkheden
| DQ (overturned by SMMAF) 
| Superior Challenge 6
| 
| align=center| 3
| align=center| 5:00
| Stockholm, Sweden
| Wins Superior Challenge Welterweight Championship 
|-
| Loss
| align=center| 21–10
| Paul Daley
| Submission (elbow)
| Impact FC 2
| 
| align=center| 3
| align=center| 1:15
| Sydney, Australia
| 
|-
| Win
| align=center| 21–9
| Cassiano Ricardo Castanho de Freitas
| Decision (unanimous)
| Platinum Fight Brazil 3
| 
| align=center| 3
| align=center| 5:00
| Sao Paulo, Brazil
| 
|-
| Loss
| align=center| 20–9
| Ivan Jorge
| Decision (unanimous)
| Floripa Fight 6 
| 
| align=center| 3
| align=center| 5:00
| Santa Catarina, Brazil
| 
|-
| Win
| align=center| 20–8
| Bobby Rehman
| Decision (unanimous)
| SC 4: Bad Intentions
| 
| align=center| 3
| align=center| 5:00
| Stockholm, Sweden
| 
|-
| Win
| align=center| 19–8
| Pedro Irie
| TKO (punches)
| First Class Fight 3
| 
| align=center| 2
| align=center| 4:11
| Sao Paulo, Brazil
| 
|-
| Win
| align=center| 18–8
| Jae Young Kim
| Decision (majority)
| M-1 Challenge 17: Korea
| 
| align=center| 2
| align=center| 5:00
| Seoul, South Korea
| 
|-
| Loss
| align=center| 17–8
| Mamed Khalidov
| KO (punches)
| KSW 11: Khalidov vs. Acacio
| 
| align=center| 1
| align=center| 1:10
| Warsaw, Poland
| 
|-
| Win
| align=center| 17–7
| Cassio Drummond
| TKO (doctor stoppage)
| The Warriors
| 
| align=center| 2
| align=center| N/A
| Rio de Janeiro, Brazil
| 
|-
| Loss
| align=center| 16–7
| Eduardo Pamplona
| Decision (split)
| Santos Fight Festival
| 
| align=center| 3
| align=center| 5:00
| Sao Paulo, Brazil
| 
|-
| Win
| align=center| 16–6
| Andrew Tigrao
| Decision (unanimous)
| Mr. Cage 1
| 
| align=center| 3
| align=center| 5:00
| Amazonas, Brazil
| 
|-
| Win
| align=center| 15–6
| | Eder Jones
| Submission (punches)
| Win Fight & Entertainment 2
| 
| align=center| 3
| align=center| 3:15
| Bahia, Brazil
| 
|-
| Win
| align=center| 14–6
| Tor Troéng
| Decision
| Fight Festival 23
| 
| align=center| 3
| align=center| 5:00
| Helsinki, Finland
| 
|-
| Loss
| align=center| 13–6
| Rousimar Palhares
| Submission (heel hook)
| Fury FC 5 - Final Conflict
| 
| align=center| 1
| align=center| 1:22
| Sao Paulo, Brazil
| Fury FC 2007 Middleweight Grand Prix Final Round
|-
| Win
| align=center| 13–5
| Andre Mikito
| Submission (slam)
| Fury FC 5 - Final Conflict
| 
| align=center| 2
| align=center| 3:40
| Sao Paulo, Brazil
| Fury FC 2007 Middleweight Grand Prix Semifinal Round
|-
| Win
| align=center| 12–5
| Gil de Freitas 
| Decision (unanimous)
| Fury FC 4: High Voltage 
| 
| align=center| 3
| align=center| 5:00
| Teresopolis, Brazil
| 
|-
| Win
| align=center| 11–5
| Michele Verginelli	 
| Decision (unanimous)
| Fury FC 3: Reloaded 
| 
| align=center| 3
| align=center| 5:00
| Sao Paulo, Brazil
| 
|-
| Loss
| align=center| 10–5
| Luis Santos 	 
| Decision (unanimous)
| Roraima Combat 3 
| 
| align=center| 3
| align=center| 5:00
| Brazil
| 
|-
| Loss
| align=center| 10–4
| Delson Heleno 	 
| Decision (unanimous)
| Fury FC 2: Final Combat 
| 
| align=center| 3
| align=center| 5:00
| Sao Paulo, Brazil
| 
|-
| Loss
| align=center| 10–3
| Ryo Kawamura  	 
| KO (punch) 
| Pancrase: Blow 7
| 
| align=center| 2
| align=center| 2:40
| Tokyo, Japan
| 
|-
| Loss
| align=center| 10–2
| Akihiro Gono  	 
| Decision (unanimous) 
| Pride Bushido 9 
| 
| align=center| 2
| align=center| 5:00
| Tokyo, Japan
| 
|-
| Win
| align=center| 10–1
| Kazuo Misaki	 
| Decision (unanimous) 
| Pride Bushido 8 
| 
| align=center| 2
| align=center| 5:00
| Nagoya, Japan
| 
|-
| Win
| align=center| 9–1
| Daiju Takase  	 
| TKO (soccer kicks) 
| Pride Bushido 6  
| 
| align=center| 2
| align=center| 3:34
| Yokohama, Japan
| 
|-
| Win
| align=center| 8–1
| Danilo Pereira
| Decision (unanimous) 
| Storm Samurai 5  
| 
| align=center| 3
| align=center| 5:00
| Curitiba, Brazil
| 
|-
| Win
| align=center| 7–1
| Eric Tavares  	 
| KO (soccer kicks) 
| Meca World Vale Tudo 11   
| 
| align=center| 1
| align=center| 2:48
| Curitiba, Brazil
| 
|-
| Win
| align=center| 6–1
| Buck Greer  	 
| KO (punch) 
| Jungle Fight 2    
| 
| align=center| 1
| align=center| N/A
| Manaus, Brazil
| 
|-
| Win
| align=center| 5–1
| Roberto Godoi 	 
| TKO (punches) 
| Meca World Vale Tudo 10   
| 
| align=center| 1
| align=center| 8:39
| Curitiba, Brazil
| 
|-
| Win
| align=center| 4–1
| Delson Heleno  	 
| TKO (corner stoppage) 
| Meca World Vale Tudo 9   
| 
| align=center| 2
| align=center| 5:00
| Curitiba, Brazil
| 
|-
| Win
| align=center| 3–1
| Guilherme Lima  	 
| TKO (punches) 
| Meca World Vale Tudo 8   
| 
| align=center| 1
| align=center| 3:50
| Curitiba, Brazil
| 
|-
| Win
| align=center| 2–1
| Jose Carlos Oliveira  	 
| Submission (rear naked choke) 
| Meca World Vale Tudo 6   
| 
| align=center| 1
| align=center| 1:44
| Curitiba, Brazil
| 
|-
| Win
| align=center| 1–1
| Silvio de Souza  	 
| Submission (keylock) 
| Meca World Vale Tudo 4  
| 
| align=center| 1
| align=center| 8:07
| Curitiba, Brazil
| 
|-
| Loss
| align=center| 0–1
| Nilson de Castro  	 
| Submission (triangle choke) 
| Meca World Vale Tudo 1 
| 
| align=center| 1
| align=center| 7:11
| Tokyo, Brazil
|

References

External links
 
 https://web.archive.org/web/20080803071204/http://www.mmapools.com/fighterinfo.php?id=916
 http://en.susumug.com/fighter/150/1540/13

1977 births
Living people
Brazilian male mixed martial artists
Welterweight mixed martial artists
Middleweight mixed martial artists
Mixed martial artists utilizing Brazilian jiu-jitsu
Brazilian practitioners of Brazilian jiu-jitsu
People awarded a black belt in Brazilian jiu-jitsu
Sportspeople from Rio de Janeiro (city)
People from Botucatu